Ginette may refer to:

Music
 "Ginette", a song by Têtes Raides.
 "Ginette", a song by Beau Dommage.

People
 Ginette Leclerc (1912–1992), French actress
 Ginette Mathiot (born 1946), French chef
 Ginette Moulin, French billionaire heiress
 Ginette Reno (born 1946), Québécoise singer and actress

Other uses
 Lycée privé Sainte-Geneviève, a French Lycée providing preparatory classes for Grandes Ecoles
 A brand name of co-cyprindiol (cyproterone acetate/ethinylestradiol), an oral contraceptive